{{DISPLAYTITLE:C8H10N2S}}
The molecular formula C8H10N2S (molar mass: 166.24 g/mol, exact mass: 166.0565 u) may refer to:

 Ethionamide
 o-Tolylthiourea

Molecular formulas